Thomas "Tom" Kottas (born 27 April 1996) is a Greek professional basketball player for CSM Târgu Jiu of the Romanian Liga Națională. He is a 2.08 m (6'10") tall  center.

Professional career 
Kottas began playing basketball with the youth teams of APS Ajax Amynteo. He then transferred to play with the youth teams of PAOK Thessaloniki in the summer of 2011. After playing with the junior teams of PAOK Thessaloniki, Kottas began his professional career in 2013, with the senior men's team of PAOK. He left the club after 3 years, due to his limited playing time.

On 26 July 2016, Kottas joined Rethymno Cretan Kings of the Greek Basket League. On 17 July 2018, Kottas signed with newly promoted team Holargos. On 3 August 2019, Kottas moved to Ionikos Nikaias. He averaged 3.8 points and 2.4 rebounds per game. 

On 27 August 2020, Kottas signed with Larisa. In 21 games, he averaged 3.4 points and 3.1 rebounds per contest. On 26 July 2021, Kottas signed with Aris, returning to Thessaloniki. In 24 games, he averaged 2.7 points, 2.4 rebounds and 0.6 blocks in under 10 minutes per contest.

On August 29, 2022, Kottas signed with Karditsa. On November 3 of the same year, he moved to Romanian club CSM Târgu Jiu for the rest of the season.

National team career 
Kottas has been a member of the Greek junior national teams. With Greece's junior national teams, he played at the 2012 FIBA Europe Under-16 Championship, and both the 2013 and 2014 FIBA Europe Under-18 Championships. He also played at the 2015 FIBA Under-19 World Cup, the 2015 FIBA Europe Under-20 Championship, and the 2nd division 2016 FIBA Europe Under-20 Championship Division B, where he won a bronze medal.

Awards and accomplishments

Greek national team 
2016 FIBA Europe Under-20 Championship Division B:

References

External links 
 Thomas Kottas at Eurocupbasketball.com
 Thomas Kottas at FIBA.com
 Thomas Kottas at FIBAEurope.com
 Thomas Kottas at Esake.gr 
 Thomas Kottas at Eurobasket.com

1996 births
Living people
Aris B.C. players
ASK Karditsas B.C. players
Centers (basketball)
Greek men's basketball players
Greek expatriate basketball people in Romania
Holargos B.C. players
Ionikos Nikaias B.C. players
Larisa B.C. players
P.A.O.K. BC players
Rethymno B.C. players
Sportspeople from Ptolemaida